The baseball tournament at the Pan American Games has long been considered to be one of the premier international baseball events in the world, even higher than the Olympic Games. This is because the level of competition is higher than in the Olympics, where only two teams from the Americas traditionally were permitted to qualify. Cuba has dominated the tournament since its inception. Cubans field their strongest players, while the Americans sent college players, as the schedule does not allow the MLB players to participate. In 2013, a women's tournament was added to the program, effective with the 2015 Games. A total of seven men and five women's teams competed in each tournament respectively. In 2019, the women's tournament was not be held, while the men's tournament shrank to 8 teams.

Men's tournament

Women's tournament

Medal table

Men's participating nations

Women's participating nations

References

 
Baseball
Pan American Games
Pan American Games